Frederick Ghahramani is a Canadian businessperson.

Education
Frederick Ghahramani studied electronics engineering at Simon Fraser University. In 2001, Ghahramani was awarded the BMO Bank of Montreal First Place Prize in the New Ventures B.C. Competition. In 2005, he then received the Business Development Bank of Canada's Young Entrepreneur of the Year Award.

Career
Ghahramani is the founder and Managing Director of airG Inc., a Canadian software company headquartered in Vancouver. He formed the company in April 2000 with his university classmates Bryce Pasechnik and Vincent Yen. Gharamani was also the founder of Just10, an advertising-free private social network where users are limited to having just 10 friends, and all content, posts, and messages are strictly private, and are permanently deleted in 10 days.

Philanthropy
In 2012, Ghahramani purchased at auction the controversial oil on canvas painting Emperor Haute Couture by Canadian artist Margaret Sutherland, in order to provide pro bono public viewings of it at educational institutions.

In 2015, Ghahramani donated $1 million to groups fighting to repeal Canada's Anti-terrorism Act, 2015. Recipients of the donation included the Canadian Journalists for Free Expression, OpenMedia.ca, and the Canadian Internet Policy and Public Interest Clinic (CIPPIC) at the University of Ottawa's Faculty of Law.

In 2016, Ghahramani along with the Open Society Foundations funded a 130-page report written by Canadian privacy experts at the University of Toronto and University of Ottawa calling for the government to acknowledge and constrain the use of portable surveillance devices that indiscriminately dredge data from people's smartphones.

References

Living people
Businesspeople from Vancouver
Canadian computer businesspeople
Canadian engineers
Canadian technology chief executives
Canadian company founders
Year of birth missing (living people)